The Stellenbosch Local Municipality council consists of forty-three members elected by mixed-member proportional representation. Twenty-two councillors are elected by first-past-the-post voting in twenty-two wards, while the remaining twenty-one are chosen from party lists so that the total number of party representatives is proportional to the number of votes received. In the 2021 local government elections, the Democratic Alliance (DA) received a majority of twenty-eight seats on the council.

Results 
The following table shows the composition of the council after past elections.

December 2000 election

The following table shows the results of the 2000 election.

October 2002 floor crossing

In terms of the Eighth Amendment of the Constitution and the judgment of the Constitutional Court in United Democratic Movement v President of the Republic of South Africa and Others, in the period from 8–22 October 2002 councillors had the opportunity to cross the floor to a different political party without losing their seats.

In the Stellenbosch council, three councillors from the Democratic Alliance (DA) crossed to the New National Party (NNP), which had formerly been part of the DA. The two councillors of the Alliance for the Community also crossed to the NNP.

By-elections from October 2002 to August 2004
The following by-elections were held to fill vacant ward seats in the period between the floor crossing periods in October 2002 and September 2004.

September 2004 floor crossing
Another floor-crossing period occurred on 1–15 September 2004, in which the five NNP councillors crossed to the ANC.

March 2006 election

The following table shows the results of the 2006 election.

September 2007 floor crossing
The final floor-crossing period occurred on 1–15 September 2007; floor-crossing was subsequently abolished in 2008 by the Fifteenth Amendment of the Constitution. In the Stellenbosch council, one councillor of the Independent Democrats crossed to the African National Congress.

By-elections from September 2007 to May 2011
The following by-elections were held to fill vacant ward seats in the period between the floor crossing period in September 2007 and the election in May 2011.

May 2011 election

The following table shows the results of the 2011 election.

By-elections from May 2011 to August 2016
The following by-elections were held to fill vacant ward seats in the period between the elections in May 2011 and August 2016.

August 2016 election

The following table shows the results of the 2016 election.

The local council sends five representatives to the council of the Cape Winelands District Municipality: four from the Democratic Alliance and one from the African National Congress

By-elections from August 2016 to November 2021
The following by-elections were held to fill vacant ward seats in the period between the elections in August 2016 and November 2021.

November 2021 election

The following table shows the results of the 2021 election.

By-elections from November 2021
The following by-elections were held to fill vacant ward seats in the period since the election in November 2021.

In a by-election in ward 21, held on 8 March 2023 after the previous DA councillor took up a vacancy in parliament, the DA candidate retained the seat for the party with a solid majority. The African Christian Democratic Party increased its share of the vote to take second place.

Notes

References

Stellenbosch
Elections in the Western Cape
elections